The ninth season of Bad Girls Club is titled Bad Girls Club: Mexico and premiered on July 9, 2012 and was filmed in Cabo San Lucas in early 2012. This is the fourth season to take place in a different location from Los Angeles, the first being season five (filmed in Miami), the second being season seven (filmed in New Orleans), and the third being season eight (filmed in Las Vegas).
Bad Girls Club: Mexico was the first season to have a three-part reunion.

Cast 
The season began with seven original bad girls, of which one left voluntarily and two were removed by production. Three replacement bad girls were introduced in their absences later in the season.

Duration of Cast

Episodes

Notes

References

External links 
 
 

Episode list using the default LineColor
Bad Girls Club seasons
2012 American television seasons
Television shows set in Mexico